is a soccer stadium in Kōriyama, Fukushima, Japan. It features natural turf but has no lighting. While J.League requires seating of at least 5,000 for J3 games, matches have been set at Kōriyama West for the future.

External links

Football venues in Japan
Sports venues in Fukushima Prefecture
Kōriyama
Fukushima United FC